Landhaura is a town and a nagar panchayat in Haridwar district in the Indian state of Uttarakhand.

History 
Gujars were present in that area earlier than 16th century. They were initially employed as Chaukidars of small villages of Doab as to protect the peasants from attacks of war bands of more powerful villages in their neighbourhood.

Later rulers of this region employed them for purpose of police and revenue collection. So after gaining strength and confidence of villagers, Gujars settled on depopulated sites and even seized some old villages for themselves.

Landhaura estate was established by a Gujar chieftain of Khubar clan. It took its name from person named Latur who migrated here after rest of his family was killed, it later became Latura and overtime changed to Landhaura.

Najib Khan Rohilla, the Mughal Governor granted rights of revenue collection to Chaudhari Nahar Singh in 1759-60 for this taluqa. After this, more and more Gujars flocked to Landhaura and were allotted large number of villages, which made Nahar Singh a successful peasant community chief. Under Mughal rule, Gujars annually exported 12000 to 15000 bullocks out of Saharanpur region, with revenue going to Mughal treasury at Saharanpur.

Over the years Nahar Singh switched his loyalties from Mughals to Sikhs and back to Mughal governor. He was imprisoned by Zabita Khan, his estate divided in half, half given to Gujar Ranjeet Singh, Nahar Singh’s rival. Nahar Singh collaborated with Sikhs to loot cattles in Najibabad region and later joined Mughal governor to drive out Sikhs.

After Nahar Sindh died, his son Ram Dayal Singh became the chief of Landhaura. 
 
In 1804, there was a local rebellion popularly known as Azimgardi, during which Ram Dayal Singh supported East India Company and helped to save their assets and employees.

After death of Ram Dayal in 1813, succession dispute occurred between his grandson Badan Singh and infant son Kushal Singh, from wife Dhan Kunwar. A settlement was reached where Dhan Kunwar paid a large sum of money and expensive goods to Badan Singh and kept Landhaura for her infant son.

In 1824, Vijay Singh Gujar, remote cousin of Ram Dayal, had planned to get rid of Kushal Singh and become head of Gujars and joined Kallu Gujar, the dacoit. But his plan didn't succeed as he was soon killed by Gurkhas.

Kushal Singh died in 1829. Dhan Kunwar died in 1836 and Lad Kunwar (wife of Kushal Singh) died in 1849, leaving her son Harbans Singh. Harbans Singh died in 1850 when he was in his early twenties, survived by infant son Raghubir Singh.

One of dancing songs among the dominant Pahansu Gujars concerns the Gujar chief of Landhaura, who was poisoned by his mother so that his mother's lover could rule in the dead son's place. In the song, the chief's wife refers in a veiled and sorrowful way to the murder in addressing her mother-in-law, but the chief's mother denies that the death has even occurred.

Role in Mutiny 
During mutiny of 1857, 300 soldiers of Sappers and Miners rebelled against British in Roorkee. They marched from Roorkee to Landhaura and requested them to employ them and fight against British and they can capture Roorkee for them. Kamal Kunwar, mother of infant Raghubir Singh denied any help to rebel soldiers and they went to Nawab of Najibabad.

On 11 Sep, 1857, Landhaura helped British to suppress Gujars of nearby territory from plundering and looting, Sahib Singh Gujar, uncle of Raghubir Singh joined with 200 of his men. British rewarded Landhaura with 11 villages for their loyal conduct during the mutiny.

End of line of succession and adoption 
Raghubir Singh died in 1868, just a year after getting his estate back from Court of Wards, leaving infant son Jagat Prakash who also died soon and with this, the line of succession of Landhaura ceased to exist. Estate rights were passed onto mother of Raghubir Singh, Kamal Kunwar (died in 1897) and Dharam Kunwar, widow of Raghubir Singh.

Dharam Kunwar, widow of Raghubir Singh adopted Dalip Singh but her clansmen raised objection as he of different gotra, so the adoption was ultimately cancelled and later Dharam Kunwar adopted one Balwant Singh.

Geography

Demographics
 India census, Landhaura had a population of 28786. Males constitute 54% of the population and females 46%. Landhaura has an average literacy rate of 72%, lower than the national average of 73%: male literacy is 82%, and female literacy is 62%. In Landhaura, 22% of the population is under 6 years of age.

Politics
It is an electoral constituency of Uttarakhand Legislative Assembly in Haridwar district.

References

External links
 Official website of Landhaura
 A song about the king of Landhaura
 History of Landhora
 Landhaura on wikimapia

Cities and towns in Haridwar district